Theresa Elizabeth Polo (born June 1, 1969) is an American actress. She starred as Pamela Martha Focker (née Byrnes) in the Meet the Parents trilogy and played the role of police officer Stef Adams Foster in the Freeform series The Fosters (2013–2018) and its spinoff Good Trouble (2019–).

Early life 
Polo was born on June 1, 1969, in Dover, Delaware to Jane (née Gentry), a homemaker, and Vincent Polo, a stereo systems designer. She is of Italian, English, and German descent. She studied ballet for 13 years beginning at age five. By age 13, she was attending New York's School of American Ballet. After winning a modeling contest, she moved to New York City at age 17 to pursue an acting career.

Career 
Polo's acting debut, in 1987, was in the role of Kristin Larsen on the ABC daytime soap opera Loving. The following year, she earned a role in primetime on the short-lived CBS series TV 101. She also starred in the 1990 miniseries The Phantom of the Opera as Christine Daaé. In 1994, Polo became a regular cast member on the last season of Northern Exposure. She later played Detective Ash on the TV series Brimstone. She appeared in a recurring guest role in the sixth and seventh seasons of The West Wing playing the role of Helen Santos, the wife of Democratic presidential candidate Matt Santos (Jimmy Smits).

In February 2005, Polo posed nude for Playboy magazine. She was ranked No. 40 on the Maxim Hot 100 Women of 2002. She was also featured in InStyle. She also starred in the Lifetime Movie Network 2006 movie, Legacy of Fear. In 2007, she starred in a Hallmark Channel movie Love is a Four Letter Word. In 2009, she starred in the feature film 2:13 and the Hallmark Channel movie Expecting a Miracle with Jason Priestley and Cheech Marin. That same year she also starred in The Beacon.

She appeared in the 2009 television pilot for Washington Field, a show about the National Capitol Response Squad, a unit of the FBI composed of elite experts in different areas who travel around the world responding to events that concern American interests. In 2010, Polo reprised her role as Pam Focker in Little Fockers, the sequel to Meet the Parents and Meet the Fockers. She also appeared in the 1980s-styled horror fantasy film, The Hole.

In 2013, Teri was cast in a lead role in the ABC Family series The Fosters. Polo played San Diego police officer Stef Adams Foster, opposite Sherri Saum, playing her wife Lena Adams Foster.  Together they parented five biological, foster and adopted children and fostered more along the way.

In 2014 Teri starred in The Christmas Shepherd as the character Sally; an author living in a small town in Massachusetts whom is devastated when Buddy, the German Shepherd runs away during a storm. 

In 2016 Polo narrated Daniel Errico's modern fairy tale short film "Rosaline". In 2019 she returned to animation (and LGBT-themed narratives) as Saylor the raven in Shabnam Rezaei's The Bravest Knight, the 13-episode Hulu animated series based on Errico's book.

After The Fosters ended its five-season run, Polo continued the role in guest appearances on the spinoff Good Trouble. In July 2020, the cast and producers of The Fosters united for a virtual table read of the pilot episode to benefit the Actors Fund, to help provide COVID-19 relief.

Polo has guest-starred on many TV shows, including The Practice, Felicity, Chicago Hope, Numb3rs, Sports Night, Frasier, Ghost Whisperer, Medium, Law & Order: LA, Castle and Criminal Minds.

Continuing to blend movies and television in her career, Polo took roles in JL Ranch and its sequel The Wedding Gift, All For Nikki, Deadly Switch, The Ravine, and Fourth Grade. Her return to television brought Teri full circle to her first love, dance, when she landed the role of former ballet dancer Julia in the Fox series The Big Leap, opposite Scott Foley and Piper Perabo.

Personal life 
In April 1997, Polo married photographer Anthony Moore. They have a son together, Griffin (born 2002). In 2003, Polo and Moore divorced.

In 2006, while on the set of a video, Polo met drummer Jamie Wollam. They moved in together and had a daughter, Bayley, in 2007, but broke up in 2012.

Filmography

Film

Television

References

External links 

 
 

20th-century American actresses
21st-century American actresses
Actresses from Delaware
American film actresses
American people of English descent
American people of German descent
American people of Italian descent
American television actresses
Living people
People from Dover, Delaware
School of American Ballet alumni
1969 births